Mohammad Zakir Hasan (born December 1, 1972, Mymensingh, Dhaka) is a former Bangladeshi cricketer who played in 1 ODI in 1997.

References

1972 births
Living people
Bangladesh One Day International cricketers
Bangladeshi cricketers
Dhaka Division cricketers
People from Mymensingh